Archetypes and Repetition is the debut album from American rock band Deepfield. The album was released in 2007 by In De Goot Recordings.

Singles
"Into The Flood"
"Don't Let Go"
"Get It"

Track listing

Personnel 

 Baxter Teal - lead vocals, rhythm guitar
 Russell Lee - drums, percussion
 J. King - lead guitar
 Dawson Huss - bass guitar, backing vocals

References 

2007 debut albums
Deepfield albums